Fetherston is a surname. Notable people with the surname include:

 Erin Fetherston (born 1980), American designer
 Jim Fetherston (born 1945), American football player
 Richard Fetherston (died 1540), English Roman Catholic priest
 Fetherston baronets